The 2012 CERH European League Final Eight was the 47th edition of the CERH European League organized by CERH. It was held in May 2012 in Lodi, Italy.

Arena

The arena that hosted the Final Eight - PalaCastellotti is the biggest multi-arena in Lodi. The seating capacity of the arena is 2600.

Competition

Bracket

Results

Quarterfinals

Semifinals

Final

See also
2012 CERS Cup Final Four

External links
 Amatori Lodi website
 CERH website

International
  Roller Hockey links worldwide
 Hoqueipatins.com-Portuguese website with results of European Championships
  Mundook-Portuguese Hockey News Website
 HockeyPista.it-Italian Hockey NewsWebsite
 rink-hockey-news - World Roller Hockey

2012 in roller hockey
International roller hockey competitions hosted by Italy
2012 in Italian sport